The Coupe de France 2000–01 was its 84th edition. It was won by the RC Strasbourg, which defeated Amiens SC in the final.

Round of 64

Round of 32

Round of 16

Quarter-finals

Semi-finals

Final

Topscorer
Djibril Cissé (5 goals)
Marama Vahirua (5 goals)

References

French federation
2000–01 Coupe de France at ScoreShelf.com

 
Coupe de France seasons
2000–01 domestic association football cups